John Henry Upton, 1st Viscount Templetown (8 November 1771 – 21 September 1846), styled The Honourable John Upton between 1776 and 1785 and known as The Lord Templetown between 1785 and 1806, was an Anglo-Irish politician.

Upton was the eldest legitimate son of Clotworthy Upton, 1st Baron Templetown, Clerk Comptroller to Augusta, Dowager Princess of Wales, by Elizabeth Boughton, daughter of Shuckburgh Boughton. Clotworthy Upton was his older brother, and the Honourable Arthur Upton and the Honourable Fulke Greville Howard were his younger brothers. He succeeded his father in the barony in April 1785, aged 13. This was an Irish peerage and entitled him to a seat in the Irish House of Lords after his 21st birthday in 1792. However, he was still able to stand for election to the British House of Commons and in 1802 he was returned to Parliament as one of two representatives for Bury St Edmunds. In 1806 he was created Viscount Templetown, in the County of Antrim, in the Irish peerage. He continued to represent Bury St Edmunds in Parliament until 1812.

Marriage, children and succession
Lord Templetown married Lady Mary Montagu, daughter of John Montagu, 5th Earl of Sandwich. She died in October 1824. Templetown survived her by over 20 years and died in September 1846, aged 74. He was succeeded by his eldest son, Henry. His second son George, who eventually succeeded in the title, was a general in the British Army,
as was his third son, Arthur.

References

External links

historyofparliamentonline.org UPTON, John Henry, 2nd Baron Templetown (I) (1771-1846), of Castle Upton, co. Antrim.

1771 births
1846 deaths
Viscounts in the Peerage of Ireland
Members of the Parliament of the United Kingdom for English constituencies
UK MPs 1802–1806
UK MPs 1806–1807
UK MPs 1807–1812
Templetown, V1
UK MPs who were granted peerages